Sania Mirza and Monica Niculescu were the defending champions, but lost in the first round to Nicole Melichar and Anna Smith.

Gabriela Dabrowski and Xu Yifan won the title, defeating Ashleigh Barty and Casey Dellacqua in the final, 3–6, 6–3, [10–8].

Seeds

Draw

Draw

References
Main Draw

Connecticut Open - Doubles
Doubles